This is a list of transfers in Serbian football for the 2011-12 winter transfer window.
Only moves featuring a Serbian SuperLiga side are listed.
The order by which the clubs are listed is equal to the classification of the SuperLiga at the winter break.

Serbian SuperLiga

Partizan Belgrade

In:

Out:

Red Star Belgrade

In:

Out:

FK Vojvodina

In:

Out:

Radnički 1923

In:

Out:

Sloboda Užice

In:

Out:

Spartak ZV Subotica

In:

Out:

OFK Beograd

In:

Out:

FK Jagodina

In:

Out:

Hajduk Kula

In:

Out:

FK Smederevo

In:

Out:

Javor Ivanjica

In:

Out:

Rad Beograd

In:

Out:

BSK Borča

In:

Out:

FK Novi Pazar

In:

 
 
 
 

Out:

 

 (to Radnički Niš)

Borac Čačak

In:

Out:

Metalac G. Milanovac

In:

Out:

See also
Serbian SuperLiga
2011–12 Serbian SuperLiga
List of Serbian football transfers summer 2011

References

External sources
 Sportske.net information agency.
 SuperLiga news at Sportski žurnal website.
 Sportal.rs information agency.
 Srpskifudbal.rs football website.

2011-12
Serbian SuperLiga
transfers